Cryphaeaceae is a family of mosses (Bryophyta).

Genera 

Tha family Cryphaeaceae contains the following genera:

Cryphaea 
Cryphaeophilum 
Cryphidium 
Cyptodon 
Cyptodontopsis 
Dendroalsia 
Dendrocryphaea 
Dendropogonella 
Pilotrichopsis 
Schoenobryum 
Sphaerotheciella

References

External links 
 

Moss families
Hypnales